Allan Bennett Wester Sr. (September 15, 1923 – February 7, 2018) was an American sportscaster nationally known for his work with the Mutual Broadcasting System, most notably on Notre Dame Fighting Irish football broadcasts. He was also the original play-by-play voice of the New Orleans Saints.

New Orleans Saints
His most famous call was of Tom Dempsey's then-National Football League (NFL) record 63-yard field goal on the last play of a 19–17 victory over the Detroit Lions at Tulane Stadium on November 8, 1970.

References

1923 births
2018 deaths
American color commentators
American horse racing announcers
American radio sports announcers
Boxing commentators
College football announcers
Golf writers and broadcasters
Major League Baseball broadcasters
Motorsport announcers
National Football League announcers
New Orleans Saints announcers
Notre Dame Fighting Irish football announcers
Olympic Games broadcasters